Emaratlui-ye Olya (also Romanized as ‘Emāratlūī-ye ‘Olyā; also known as ‘Emāratlū) is a village in Arshaq-e Gharbi Rural District, Moradlu District, Meshgin Shahr County, Ardabil Province, Iran. At the 2006 census, its population was 36, in 10 families.

References 

Towns and villages in Meshgin Shahr County